The 1997 National Hurling League (known as the Church & General National Hurling League for sponsorship reasons) was the 66th seasons of the National Hurling League.

Structural changes

At a meeting of Central Council on 18 May 1996, the GAA decided to scrap winter league hurling for a two-year trial period. It was also decided, by a margin of 23 votes to 15, to complete the National Hurling League within the calendar year. After further negotiations the GAA decided to run the league on a March to October basis. Other provisions included the playing of three matches in March, two in April and one each in May and June. The league final was to be played in October. Play-offs to determine the standings of teams within the divisions were also abandoned in favour of using scoring averages.

Division 1

Galway came into the season as defending champions of the 1995-96 season. Laois, Limerick and Wexford joined Division 1 as the promoted teams.

On 5 October 1997, Limerick won the title after a 1-12 to 1-9 win over Galway in the final. It was their 11th league title overall and their first since 1991-92.

Clare, Laois and Wexford were relegated.

Kilkenny's D. J. Carey was the Division 1 top scorer with 5-43.

Table

Group stage

Knock-out stage

Quarter-finals

Semi-finals

Final

Top scorers

Top scorers overall

Top scorers in a single game

Division 2

Table

Group stage

Top scorers

Top scorers overall

Top scorers in a single game

References

External links

League
National Hurling League seasons